François Bonnardel (born November 8, 1967) is a Canadian politician. He is the Member of the National Assembly of Quebec, Canada, for the riding of Granby. He previously represented the now-defunct Action démocratique du Québec (ADQ) party, but now represents the Coalition Avenir Québec (CAQ), following the merger of the ADQ with the CAQ. On October 18, 2018, he was appointed as Minister of Transport in Quebec Premier Francois Legault's cabinet.

Political career
Bonnardel was first elected in the riding of Shefford in the 2007 election with 42% of the vote after a late surge vaulted the ADQ to Official Opposition status. Liberal incumbent Bernard Brodeur finished second with 28% of the vote.

On March 29, 2007, Bonnardel was appointed Opposition House Whip.

Bonnardel was considered a potential candidate in the 2009 ADQ leadership race, but ultimately endorsed, and became a campaign chair for, Gilles Taillon. Taillon won the leadership, but as he was not a sitting MNA, Bonnardel served as the party's leader in the National Assembly.

On January 23, 2012, he was named a member of the Coalition Avenir Québec party executive.

Due to riding redistribution, the riding of Shefford was split, and Bonnardel was elected in the new riding of Granby in the 2012 election.  In the 2014 election, Bonnardel won his riding with a larger majority than any other CAQ candidate (10,881 votes over the second-place candidate, Joanne Lalumière of the Parti québécois).  In April 2014, he was appointed CAQ House Leader.

Personal life
Bonnardel was born in Verdun, Quebec. Bonnardel's father was born in Marseille, France. His mother is from Lac-Saint-Jean, Quebec.

After studies at the Collège militaire royal de Saint-Jean and the Cégep du Vieux Montréal in sciences, Bonnardel was a clerk for personal and business finances and was also a manager and owner of local auto part companies in Granby. He was also a member of the Brome-Missisquoi and Haute-Yamaska Chamber of Commerces in the Eastern Townships region and an organization committee member for the Canadian Red Cross (Quebec Division).

On April 23, 2009, Bonnardel and Nathalie Normandeau, the Deputy Premier of Quebec and a member of the Liberal government, announced that they were dating.  The unusual relationship, between a government minister and one of the government's opposition critics, ended in 2010.

Footnotes

External links
 

1967 births
French Quebecers
Action démocratique du Québec MNAs
Coalition Avenir Québec MNAs
Living people
People from Verdun, Quebec
Politicians from Montreal
Royal Military College Saint-Jean alumni
21st-century Canadian politicians
Members of the Executive Council of Quebec